Faehn is a surname. Notable people with the surname include:

Bob Faehn (1958–2021), American politician
Rhonda Faehn (born 1971), American gymnast and gymnastics coach

See also
Fahn